Not to be confused with the Town of Blyth, England.

Blyth is a village in North Huron, Huron County, Ontario, Canada.

The 2016 Canadian Census showed Blyth had a population of approximately 1,000 residents.

Despite its small size, Blyth has a significant national presence.  The village attracts hundreds of thousands of visitors annually to its world-renowned theatre, destination craft brewery and large municipal campground.  As well, Blyth has several prominent employers creating job opportunities not found in many rural regions of Canada.

Residents pronounce the name of their village "bly-eth" rather than "blithe".

History
The first European settlers, Lucius McConnell and Kenneth McBean, arrived in what is now Blyth in 1851. The first store was opened by John Templeton. In 1854, John Drummond built the first hotel (present-day site of The Blyth Inn). A shoe shop, blacksmith shop, tailor shop and sawmill were all set up around the same time.

By 1855, a layout for the village of Drummond was made, however the village was renamed Blyth in recognition of British land speculator Henry Blyth.  In 1856, a post office was established and until 1891, the postal service officially, and incorrectly, spelled Blyth with an "e" on the end (Blythe). Henry Blyth never visited the village.

By the mid-1860s, Blyth's businesses included a grist and flour mill, steam sawmill, 4 general stores, stove and tinshop, carriage and wagon factory, 3 blacksmith shops, a saddlery, a tailor shop, 3 shoe shops, a cooper shop, 3 hotels and one medical doctor.

In 1876, the first train service, The London, Huron and Bruce Railway, came to Blyth. One year later, the village was incorporated with a population of approximately 800 residents. The community's first elected reeve was Patrick Kelly.

In 1877, a two-room public school was built and opened.

In the 1890s, a chopping mill and cider press were opened. Other early businesses in Blyth included a bake shop, a cement block making shop, a Massey Harris implement shop, a livery, a dressmaker shop, the cooper shop that made renowned apple barrels. In 1896, a four-room public school was constructed at the corner of King and Wellington Streets.

In 1907, a stop of the Canadian Pacific Railway line from Guelph to Goderich was established in Blyth. The daily train included a passenger coach with daily connections through to Toronto. The last train was in 1988, and the rail line is now the Guelph to Goderich (G2G) trail.

In 1920, construction began on the Blyth Memorial Hall, a joint effort by residents of Blyth and the Townships of East Wawanosh, Morris and Hullett. The Hall aimed to commemorate the lives of local World War 1 soldiers who died in the war. The sod was first turned and first cornerstone laid on July 28, 1920. The Hall placed 600 opera chairs in its auditorium and construction costs were estimated at $25,000. The Hall was frequently used in its early days for "banquets, council meetings, wedding receptions, Division Court Sessions, community dances" along with vaudeville productions, community musicals and local talent shows. However, interest in the Hall waned by the mid-1950s, and the auditorium was rarely used and eventually condemned. A local group of citizens campaigned and fundraised to renovate it.

In 1975, the Blyth Festival produced its first professional theatre production in Blyth. The summer theatre eventually turned into the Blyth Centre for the Arts, incorporating an art gallery, choir and orchestra.

In 2001 Blyth amalgamated with East Wawanosh Township and Wingham to form the Township of North Huron.

Today, Blyth is a rural Canadian success story. The village has been recognized as a model for Canadian rural communities who incorporate arts and culture to diversify community economy to move beyond solely an agriculture-based model.

Demographics 

Notable people 
Lorna Bray Debliquy: Female aviation pioneer and member of The Order of Canada.
John B. Kelly: Creator of the first automobile in Ontario (4 years before Henry Ford made his first car).
Ron Mason: Most successful hockey coach in NCAA history. Member of the United States Hockey Hall of Fame.
Justin Peters: Professional hockey player (goalie), bronze medalists with 2018 Canadian Men's Olympic Hockey Team.
Anthony Peters: Professional hockey player (goalie), brother of Justin.
Ernie Phillips: Resident and long-time engraver of the NHL's Stanley Cup.

Awards
In 2001, Blyth won the Communities in Bloom National Award in the category of 1 to 1000 population. This award recognizes civic pride, environmental responsibility and beautification through community involvement and the challenge of a national program, with focus on enhancing green spaces in communities.

Climate

Media
Blyth is home to the North Huron Citizen print and online newspaper.

References

 The Settlement Of Huron County, by James Scott.

External links 
 BlythNow

Designated places in Ontario
Communities in Huron County, Ontario
Former villages in Ontario
Populated places disestablished in 2001